Ozyptila monroensis is a species of crab spider in the family Thomisidae. It is found in the United States and Canada.

References

monroensis
Articles created by Qbugbot
Spiders described in 1884
Spiders of the United States
Spiders of Canada